"I Do" is a song by British-American band Fleetwood Mac, from their 1995 album Time. The song was released as a single to support the album and charted at number 62 in Canada. The song was written by Christine McVie and Eddy Quintela, and produced by long-time Fleetwood Mac producer Richard Dashut. An edit of the song was included in the deluxe version of box-set 50 Years – Don't Stop.

Personnel
Christine McVie – keyboards, lead vocals
Billy Burnette – guitar, backing vocals
John McVie – bass guitar
Mick Fleetwood – drums, tambourine
Bekka Bramlett – backing vocals
Michael Thompson – guitar

Charts

References

Fleetwood Mac songs
1994 songs
1995 singles
Songs written by Christine McVie
Songs written by Eddy Quintela
Song recordings produced by Richard Dashut
Warner Records singles